Jimmy Abegg (born December 29, 1954), also known as Jimmy A, is an American musician who grew up in Alliance, Nebraska and is currently living in Nashville, Tennessee.

In 1985, Abegg was a founding member of the progressive rock band Vector from Sacramento, California, which included Steve Griffith, Charlie Peacock, Aaron Smith (drums 1985) and Bruce Spencer (drums 1985–89). In the 1990s, he played as a solo musician, then joined Rich Mullins' A Ragamuffin Band and was also a member of Charlie Peacock's Acoustic Trio. He has created a variety of album artwork for artists such as Phil Keaggy, Michael W. Smith, and Chris Taylor among others. Abegg has written or co-written songs for Susan Ashton and Ji Lim. He completed a series for Vanderbilt Children's Hospital. Abegg also collaborated with Kevin Max on a collection of illustrated poems entitled At the Foot of Heaven in 1995.

Abegg suffers from macular degeneration, but continues to paint.

Books

Discography

With Vector

 1983 Mannequin Virtue
 1985 Please Stand By
 1989 Simple Experience
 1995 Temptation

Solo

 1991 Entertaining Angels
 1994 Secrets

With Charlie Peacock

 1984 Lie Down in the Grass
 1987 West Coast Diaries: Vol. 1
 1988 West Coast Diaries: Vol. 2
 1989 West Coast Diaries: Vol. 3
 1990 Secret of Time
 1991 Love Life

As part of Rich Mullins & A Ragamuffin Band

 1993 A Liturgy, a Legacy & a Ragamuffin Band
 1995 Brother's Keeper
 1996 Songs
 1998 The Jesus Record
 2000 Prayers of a Ragamuffin A Ragamuffin Band only

Collaborative works

 1998 Demonstrations of Love
 1999 When Worlds Collide: A Tribute to Daniel Amos a tribute to Daniel Amos
 2002 Making God Smile: An Artists' Tribute to the Songs of Beach Boy Brian Wilson a tribute to Brian Wilson

As part of Steve Taylor & The Perfect Foil

 2014 Goliath
 2016 Wow to the Deadness (EP; as Steve Taylor & the Danielson Foil)

References

External links
 

1954 births
Living people
American male musicians
American photographers
Musicians from Nashville, Tennessee
People from Box Butte County, Nebraska
A Ragamuffin Band members
Vector (band) members
Steve Taylor & The Perfect Foil members